Two Cities Films was a British film production company. Formed in 1937, it was originally envisaged as a production company operating in the two cities of London and Rome which gave the company its name.

The driving forces behind the company were the flamboyant, Italian-born Filippo Del Giudice, and his partner the multitalented Mario Zampi, born in Sora, Italy who often worked in the dual role of director and producer. Two Cities produced a number of quintessentially English film classics including the most popular British film from the wartime period, In Which We Serve (1942).

Other Two Cities films such as This Happy Breed (1944), The Way Ahead (1944), Henry V (1944), The Way to the Stars (1945), and Blithe Spirit (1945) contributed significantly to the high critical reputation acquired by the British cinema of the time.

In the mid-1940s Two Cities Films became part of the Rank Organisation. It was raising the finances for the production of Laurence Olivier's patriotic epic Henry V (1944) totalling more than £470,000, which forced Filippo Del Giudice to surrender his controlling interest in the company to the Rank Organisation.
Under Rank they produced key films such as Odd Man Out (1947), Hamlet (1948), and Vice Versa (1948).

Two Cities Films is now owned by Gregory Motton.

New Production
The company went back into production in 2017 with the shooting of The Four Gospels of Dracula the Messiah, a quartet of films,The Four Gospels of Dracula the Messiah, part one: A Voice Crying In The Wilderness,
The Four Gospels of Dracula the Messiah part two; Conquering Death,
The Four Gospels of Dracula the Messiah part three, The Seducer,
The Four Gospels of Dracula the Messiah part four is to be released in January 2022,
Lilith (2022),
Dracula (2022)

Select filmography

 French Without Tears (1939)
 Unpublished Story (1942)
 In Which We Serve (1942)
 The Demi-Paradise (1943)
 The Flemish Farm (1943)
 The Gentle Sex (1943)
 The Lamp Still Burns (1943)
 This Happy Breed (1944)
 The Way Ahead (1944)
 Henry V (1944)
 Blithe Spirit (1945)
 The Way to the Stars (1945)
 The Way We Live (1946)
 Men of Two Worlds (1946)
 Odd Man Out (1947)
 Vice Versa (1948)
 Mr. Perrin and Mr. Traill (1948)
 Hamlet (1948)
 Trottie True (1948)
 Madness of the Heart (1949)
 Prelude to Fame (1950)
 Personal Affair (1953)
 Trouble in Store (1953)
 The Purple Plain (1954)
 The Four Gospels of Dracula the Messiah (2019)
 Dracula (2022)
 Lilith (2022)

References

External links
 Two Cities Films at IMDb
 Two Cities Films at BFI Screenonline
 Website 

Film production companies of the United Kingdom
British film studios